The 1946 Baylor Bears football team represented Baylor University in the Southwest Conference (SWC) during the 1946 college football season. In their fourth and final season under head coach Frank Kimbrough, the Bears compiled a 1–8 record (0–6 against conference opponents), finished in last place in the conference, and were outscored by opponents by a combined total of 181 to 56. They played their home games at Municipal Stadium in Waco, Texas. Olan Runnels and Wenzell A. Gandy were the team captains.

Schedule

After the season

The 1947 NFL Draft was held on December 16, 1946. The following Bear was selected.

References

Baylor
Baylor Bears football seasons
Baylor Bears football